The 1912 Democratic National Convention was held at the Fifth Regiment Armory off North Howard Street in Baltimore from June 25 to July 2, 1912.

The Convention
The convention was held at the Fifth Regiment Armory in Baltimore from June 25 to July 2, 1912. It proved to be one of the more memorable United States presidential conventions of the 20th century.

1904 Presidential nominee Judge Alton B. Parker of New York served as the Temporary chairman and Keynote Speaker while Representative Ollie M. James of Kentucky served as Permanent Convention chairman.

, this is the last major party convention to be held in Baltimore.

Presidential candidates

Withdrew During Balloting

Declined

The main candidates were House Speaker Champ Clark of Missouri and Governor Woodrow Wilson of New Jersey. Both Clark and Wilson had won a number of primaries, and Clark entered the convention with more pledged delegates than did Wilson. However, he lacked the two-thirds vote necessary to secure the presidential nomination.

Initially, the front runner appeared to be Clark, who received 440¼ votes on the first ballot to 324 for Wilson. Governor Judson Harmon of Ohio received 148 votes while U.S. Representative Oscar W. Underwood of Alabama, the Chairman of the House Ways and Means Committee, received 117¼ with the rest of the votes scattered among the other delegates. No candidate managed to gain a majority until the ninth ballot, when the New York delegation shifted its allegiance to Clark. Due to the then-official two-thirds rule used by the Democratic Party, Clark was never able to secure the presidential nomination as he failed to get the necessary two-thirds vote for victory.

In past conventions, once a candidate received a majority of the votes, it would start a bandwagon rolling to the nomination. Clark's chances were hurt when Tammany Hall, the powerful and corrupt Democratic political machine in New York City, threw its support behind him. This was the move that gave Clark a majority on the ninth ballot, but instead of propelling Clark's bandwagon towards victory, the endorsement led William Jennings Bryan to turn against the Speaker of the House. A three-time Democratic presidential candidate and still the leader of the party's liberals, Bryan delivered a speech denouncing Clark as the candidate of "Wall Street".

Up until the Tammany endorsement, Bryan had remained neutral, but once the corrupt machine put itself behind Clark, he threw his support to New Jersey Governor Woodrow Wilson, who was regarded as a moderate reformer.

Additionally Illinois Democratic Boss, Roger Charles Sullivan and Indiana Democratic Boss Thomas Taggart made a deal with a member of Wilson's campaign. In exchange for having Thomas R. Marshall be Wilsons running mate, Illinois and Indiana would put their support behind Wilson.

Before these events, Wilson had consistently finished second to Clark on each ballot, Ironically, Wilson had nearly given up hope that he could be nominated, and he was on the verge of having a concession speech read for him at the convention freeing his delegates to vote for someone else. After receiving the support of Bryan, Sullivan, and Taggart, Wilson gradually gained in strength while Clark's support dwindled. Wilson received the presidential nomination on the 46th ballot.

Presidential balloting
The 46 ballots were the most cast at a convention since 1860.

Vice Presidential candidates

Withdrew During Balloting

Declined

Clark and Bryan were both proposed as vice presidential nominees, but both declined, with Clark preferring to remain as Speaker and Bryan fearful of overshadowing Wilson. Bryan instead proposed Oregon Senator George E. Chamberlain and North Dakota Governor John Burke, the latter of whom became the main progressive candidate. Governor Thomas R. Marshall of Indiana, who had swung his state's delegate votes to Wilson in later ballots, became the major candidate of conservatives. After the second ballot, Representative William Hughes, a leading campaign manager of Wilson's, successfully proposed making the nomination of Marshall unanimous. Wilson and Marshall went on to win a landslide victory in the 1912 presidential election against a split Republican Party.

References in popular culture
The primary battles leading up to the 1912 Democratic Convention are a pivotal event in Taylor Caldwell's 1972 novel Captains and the Kings. In the novel, the fictional Irish-Catholic Rory Daniel Armagh, a U.S. Senator from Pennsylvania, emerges as the front-runner for the 1912 Democratic presidential nomination after beating Woodrow Wilson in multiple primaries. (Unlike in real life, Champ Clark is not a factor in the novel.) Armagh is assassinated as part of a conspiracy of international power brokers before the convention.

Scenes of the convention are depicted in the 1944 biographical film Wilson.

See also
1912 Democratic Party presidential primaries
History of the United States Democratic Party
1912 Republican National Convention
1912 United States presidential election
Democratic National Convention

References

Bibliography

 Official report of the proceedings of the Democratic national convention, held in Baltimore, Maryland, June 25, 26, 27, 28, 29 and July 1 and 2, 1912
 William Jennings Bryan, Virgil V. McNitt. A Tale of Two Conventions. Funk & Wagnalls Company, 1912.

External links
 Democratic Party Platform of 1912 at The American Presidency Project

1912 United States presidential election
1912 in Maryland
1910s in Baltimore
Political conventions in Baltimore
Maryland Democratic Party
Political events in Maryland
Democratic National Conventions
1912 conferences
June 1912 events
July 1912 events